Evans Mogaka (born 21 December 1949) is a Kenyan long-distance runner. He competed in the men's 5000 metres at the 1972 Summer Olympics.

References

1949 births
Living people
Athletes (track and field) at the 1972 Summer Olympics
Kenyan male long-distance runners
Olympic athletes of Kenya
Athletes (track and field) at the 1974 British Commonwealth Games
Commonwealth Games bronze medallists for Kenya
Commonwealth Games medallists in athletics
African Games silver medalists for Kenya
African Games medalists in athletics (track and field)
Place of birth missing (living people)
Athletes (track and field) at the 1973 All-Africa Games
Medallists at the 1974 British Commonwealth Games